Chris Robanske (born December 30, 1989) is a Canadian snowboarder. He competes primarily in snowboard cross and represented Canada in this event at the 2014 Winter Olympics in Sochi and the 2018 Winter Olympics in PyeongChang.

References

External links
 
 
 
 
 

1989 births
Living people
Canadian male snowboarders
Sportspeople from Calgary
Snowboarders at the 2014 Winter Olympics
Snowboarders at the 2018 Winter Olympics
Olympic snowboarders of Canada